Coleophora versurella is a moth of the family Coleophoridae. It was described by Philipp Christoph Zeller in 1849.

Description

The wingspan is 11–15 mm. Adults are on wing from June to September. Several other species of Coleophora look similar and are best identified by reference to the genitalia. The larvae feed on orache (Atriplex species) and goosefoot (Chenopodium species). Other recorded food plants include sea purslane (Halimione portulacoides)  and Amaranthus. In its later stages, the larva creates a case made from silk and specks of plant material or droppings.

Distribution
It is found everywhere in Europe except for Iceland and Luxembourg. It has also been recorded from Argentina, India, the United Arab Emirates and Oman.

References

External links
 Swedish Moths

versurella
Moths described in 1849
Moths of Asia
Moths of Europe
Moths of South America
Taxa named by Philipp Christoph Zeller